Akona Zilindlovu Ndungane (born 20 February 1981 in Mthatha, South Africa) is a former South African rugby union player whose usual position was on the wing, although he also played as the centre.

In 2004, he was included in the South Africa Sevens side that competed at the IRB Sevens World Series in Bordeaux and London. He also represented the Springboks in 2006 and 2007, and was part of the victorious 2007 Rugby World Cup squad.

He announced his retirement at the conclusion of the 2015 Super Rugby season, having made in excess of hundred appearances for the Bulls in Super Rugby and a similar amount in domestic rugby with the Blue Bulls, Border Bulldogs and Mighty Elephants.

References

External links

Akona Ndungane on bluebulls.co.za
Akona Ndungane on itsrugby.co.uk

1981 births
Living people
People from Mthatha
Xhosa people
Twin sportspeople
South African twins
South African rugby union players
South Africa international rugby union players
Bulls (rugby union) players
Blue Bulls players
Rugby union wings
South Africa international rugby sevens players
Male rugby sevens players
Rugby union players from the Eastern Cape